Chandler or The Chandler may refer to:

 Chandler (occupation), originally head of the medieval household office responsible for candles, now a person who makes or sells candles
 Ship chandler, a dealer in supplies or equipment for ships

Arts and entertainment
 Chandler (band), an American Christian band 
 Chandler (film), 1971 
 Chandler: Red Tide, a 1976 illustrated novel by Jim Steranko
 Chandler Award, for Australian science fiction
 Chandler Bing, a fictional character in the sitcom Friends

Buildings and schools
 The Chandler Building, in Berkeley, California, U.S.
 Albert B. Chandler Hospital, in Lexington, Kentucky, U.S.
 Chandler High School (disambiguation), several schools
 Chandler School, in Pasadena, California, U.S.
 Chandler Scientific School, formerly part of Dartmouth College, U.S.

People 
 Chandler (surname), including a list of people and fictional characters
 Chandler (given name), including a list of people and a fictional character

Places

Australia
 Chandler, Queensland, a suburb of Brisbane
 Chandler, South Australia
 Chandler, Western Australia
 Chandler Highway, in the suburbs of Melbourne
 Chandler River (New South Wales), Australia

Canada
 Chandler, Quebec
 Chandler, Saskatchewan

United States
 Chandler River (Alaska)
 Chandler, Arizona
 Chandler, Indiana, in Warrick County
 Chandler, Pike County, Indiana
 Chandler Bay, Maine
 Chandler River (Maine)
 Chandler Township, Charlevoix County, Michigan
 Chandler Township, Huron County, Michigan
 Chandler, Minnesota
 Chandler Air Force Station, a closed radar station 
 Chandler, Missouri
 Chandler Township, Adams County, North Dakota
 Chandler, Ohio
 Chandler, Oklahoma
 Chandler State Wayside, a state park in Oregon
 Chandler, Texas

Elsewhere
 Chandler (crater), on the Moon
 Chandler Island, Antarctica
 Chandler River (disambiguation), several rivers in the United States and Australia

Other uses
 USS Chandler, the name of two ships of the U.S. Navy
 Chandler Formation, a Mesozoic geologic formation in Canada
 Chandler (horse), winner of the 1848 Grand National steeplechase
 Chandler (software), personal information management software 
 Chandler Motor Car, a 1920s American automobile maker

See also 
 
 
 Chandelier, a branched ornamental light fixture